Alexandra Alexandrovna Panova (born 2 March 1989) is a Russian professional tennis player.

On 30 July 2012, she achieved a career-high singles ranking of world No. 71. On 18 January 2016, she peaked at No. 38 in the doubles rankings.

She has won seven doubles titles on the WTA Tour. On the ITF Women's Circuit, she won two of her 16 doubles titles with her older sister Olga Panova.

Career

2009
In January, Panova obtained an invitation from the Hong Kong Tennis Patrons' Association to play JB Group Classic with her compatriot Anna Chakvetadze (she replaced Maria Sharapova for injury) and Vera Zvonareva, and then she entered the Australian Open women's qualifying singles unseeded and made it to the qualifying third round before losing to unseeded Julia Schruff of Germany, in two sets.

2011
In August, Panova made her Grand Slam debut at the US Open by coming through qualifying. In the first round she faced the eighth seed Marion Bartoli, a match that she ended up losing in straight sets.

2012
In February Panova made it to her first WTA Tour final at the Copa Colsanitas, upsetting the fifth seed Gisela Dulko along the way. She lost to Lara Arruabarrena in the final, but won the doubles championship. She then won her second doubles title of the year at the Morocco Open.

At the US Open, Panova faced then-world No. 1 and eventual runner-up, Victoria Azarenka, in the first round and was heavily defeated, losing in straight sets and winning just one game.

2013
Panova participated in the Fed Cup final against Italy. She lost a marathon match against Roberta Vinci in the first rubber. Panova squandered a 7–5, 5–2, 40–15 lead. Italy went on to win the Fed Cup tie 3–0.

2014
Panova started her 2014 season at the Brisbane International. Getting past qualifying, she lost in her first-round match to 2012 champion Kaia Kanepi. At the Australian Open, Panova was defeated in the second round of qualifying by Stéphanie Dubois.

Panova won her fourth WTA doubles title at the Baku Cup, partnering with British Heather Watson. In the final they crushed Raluca Olaru and Shahar Pe'er.

Now with Margarita Gasparyan as her doubles partner, Panova reached the finals of the Tashkent Open, losing to Krunić/Siniaková. This was Gasparyan's first WTA Tour final in her career.

2015
Panova entered the main draw at the Australian Open through qualifying. She won her first ever match at a Grand Slam by beating Sorana Cîrstea in the first round. She then came up against fellow countrywoman Maria Sharapova in the second round and lost in three sets after having two match points on her serve.

2016
Panova started the season losing in the qualifyings of Brisbane, Australian Open and St. Petersburg. She received her first main-draw entry at the Malaysian Open, losing there in the first round. She renewed herself in Bogotá, where she has been traditionally playing well. There, Panova defeated the top-seeded Elina Svitolina, saving five match points in the third set after being 3–6 behind.

Performance timelines
Only main-draw results in WTA Tour, Grand Slam tournaments, Fed Cup/Billie Jean King Cup and Olympic Games are included in win–loss records.

Singles
Current after the 2017 season.

Doubles
Current after the 2023 Linz Open.

WTA career finals

Singles: 1 (runner-up)

Doubles: 14 (7 titles, 7 runner-ups)

WTA Challenger finals

Doubles: 2 (2 runner-ups)

ITF Circuit finals

Singles: 15 (8 titles, 7 runner–ups)

Doubles: 28 (16 titles, 12 runner–ups)

Notes

References

External links

 
 
 
 
 Alexandra Panova statistics

1989 births
Living people
Sportspeople from Krasnodar
Russian female tennis players
Tennis players from Moscow